The Italian Union of Landworkers (UIL-TERRA) was a trade union representing agricultural workers and farmers in Italy.

The union was founded in 1950, by former members of the National Federation of Agricultural Workers, and held its first conference in 1951.  It was a founding affiliate of the Italian Labour Union, and also joined the International Landworkers' Federation.  It grew rapidly, and by 1964, it had 488,697 members.  That year, it split into the Italian Union of Agricultural Labourers and Workers and the Italian Union of Farm Owners and Tenants.

General Secretaries
1950: Amedeo Sommovigo
1953: Aride Rossi

References

Agriculture and forestry trade unions
Trade unions established in 1950
Trade unions disestablished in 1964
Trade unions in Italy